Baba Jagdev Yadav Degree College is a public school in India founded in 2013. It is a constituent college of Allahabad State University Allahabad, located in Allahabad. The college's courses focus on the arts and sciences. The college address is Baba Jagdev Yadav Degree College Dumduma (Ashdhiya) Handia Allahabad. Mr. Rasal Singh Yadav is the manager of the college. There are 45 halls, a library, and a reading room (""). There are five laboratories: Physics, Chemistry, Zoology, Botany and Home Science.

Location 
Saidabad Rail Way Station, Ramnathpur Rail Way Stations of Varansi Division of North Eastern Railway and Phulpur Station of Lucknow Division of Northern Railway are the very nearby railway stations to Dumduma. However Allahabad Jn Rail Way Station is major railway station 35 km near to Baba Jagdev Yadav Degree College Dumduma. You can go by taxi and buses linked road from Saidabd To Asdhiya Bazar then 1 km.west side from Asdhiya Bazar to Dumduma where situated Baba Jagdev Yadav Degree College. From Saidabad the distance of college is 8.750 km.

The college first session started 2014–2015. The exam of the college started on 2 March 2015. The result of the college first session was very good.  The college 2nd session result was also very good.

Educational institutions established in 2013
2013 establishments in Uttar Pradesh